William Bradwell (December 1822 - Juoy 16, 1887) was a religious leader and Reconstruction era politician in Florida. He lived in Jacksonville and represented Duval County in the Florida Legislature. An African American, he was a leader in the A.M.E. Church. He served in the Florida Senate representing Duval County, Florida from 1868 to 1870. He was a Republican and stated that his father was "one of the first representatives to the Legislature of Georgia".

He was a minister.

Following the Reconstruction acts passed in the U.S. Congress he was involved in organizing Black voters and supported a ticket with Republican Ossian B. Hart.

See also 
 List of African-American officeholders during Reconstruction

References 

People from Jacksonville, Florida
African Methodist Episcopal Church clergy
Members of the Florida House of Representatives
19th-century American politicians
19th-century American Episcopalians
African-American Christian clergy
African-American politicians during the Reconstruction Era
African-American state legislators in Florida
1822 births
1887 deaths